Penochalasin A is a cytotoxic alkaloid produced by Penicillium species.

References

Tryptamine alkaloids
Toxins
Epoxides
Heterocyclic compounds with 5 rings
Lactams
Pyrrolidine alkaloids